Mazoon Khalfan Saleh Al-Alawi (born 14 November 1997) is an Omani sprinter.

She competed at the 2016 Summer Olympics in Rio de Janeiro, in the women's 100 metres. She progressed from the first preliminary round with a time of 12.30 seconds. In the quarterfinal, she finished with a time of 12.43 seconds. She did not advance to the semifinals.

References

External links

1997 births
Living people
Omani female sprinters
Olympic athletes of Oman
Athletes (track and field) at the 2016 Summer Olympics
Athletes (track and field) at the 2014 Asian Games
Asian Games competitors for Oman
Athletes (track and field) at the 2020 Summer Olympics
Olympic female sprinters